Zero-sum game is a mathematical representation in game theory and economic theory of a situation which involves two sides, where the result is an advantage for one side and an equivalent loss for the other. In other words, player one's gain is equivalent to player two's loss, therefore the net improvement in benefit of the game is zero.

If the total gains of the participants are added up, and the total losses are subtracted, they will sum to zero. Thus, cutting a cake, where taking a more significant piece reduces the amount of cake available for others as much as it increases the amount available for that taker, is a zero-sum game if all participants value each unit of cake equally. Other examples of zero-sum games in daily life include games like poker, chess, and bridge where one person gains and another person loses, which results in a zero-net benefit for every player. In the markets and financial instruments, futures contracts and options are zero-sum games as well.

In contrast, non-zero-sum describes a situation in which the interacting parties' aggregate gains and losses can be less than or more than zero. A zero-sum game is also called a strictly competitive game, while non-zero-sum games can be either competitive or non-competitive. Zero-sum games are most often solved with the minimax theorem which is closely related to linear programming duality, or with Nash equilibrium. Prisoner's Dilemma is a classical non-zero-sum game.

Definition 

The zero-sum property (if one gains, another loses) means that any result of a zero-sum situation is Pareto optimal. Generally, any game where all strategies are Pareto optimal is called a conflict game.

Zero-sum games are a specific example of constant sum games where the sum of each outcome is always zero. Such games are distributive, not integrative; the pie cannot be enlarged by good negotiation.

In situation where one decision maker's gain (or loss) does not necessarily result in the other decision makers' loss (or gain), they are referred to as non-zero-sum. Thus, a country with an excess of bananas trading with another country for their excess of apples, where both benefit from the transaction, is in a non-zero-sum situation.  Other non-zero-sum games are games in which the sum of gains and losses by the players is sometimes more or less than what they began with.

The idea of Pareto optimal payoff in a zero-sum game gives rise to a generalized relative selfish rationality standard, the punishing-the-opponent standard, where both players always seek to minimize the opponent's payoff at a favourable cost to themselves rather than prefer more over less. The punishing-the-opponent standard can be used in both zero-sum games (e.g. warfare game, chess) and non-zero-sum games (e.g. pooling selection games). The player in the game has a simple enough desire to maximise the profit for them, and the opponent wishes to minimise it.

Solution 

For two-player finite zero-sum games, the different game theoretic solution concepts of Nash equilibrium, minimax, and maximin all give the same solution. If the players are allowed to play a mixed strategy, the game always has an equilibrium.

Example 

A game's payoff matrix is a convenient representation. Consider these situations as an example, the two-player zero-sum game pictured at right or above.

The order of play proceeds as follows: The first player (red) chooses in secret one of the two actions 1 or 2; the second player (blue), unaware of the first player's choice, chooses in secret one of the three actions A, B or C. Then, the choices are revealed and each player's points total is affected according to the payoff for those choices.

Example: Red chooses action 2 and Blue chooses action B. When the payoff is allocated, Red gains 20 points and Blue loses 20 points.

In this example game, both players know the payoff matrix and attempt to maximize the number of their points. Red could reason as follows: "With action 2, I could lose up to 20 points and can win only 20, and with action 1 I can lose only 10 but can win up to 30, so action 1 looks a lot better." With similar reasoning, Blue would choose action C. If both players take these actions, Red will win 20 points. If Blue anticipates Red's reasoning and choice of action 1, Blue may choose action B, so as to win 10 points. If Red, in turn, anticipates this trick and goes for action 2, this wins Red 20 points.

Émile Borel and John von Neumann had the fundamental insight that probability provides a way out of this conundrum. Instead of deciding on a definite action to take, the two players assign probabilities to their respective actions, and then use a random device which, according to these probabilities, chooses an action for them. Each player computes the probabilities so as to minimize the maximum expected point-loss independent of the opponent's strategy. This leads to a linear programming problem with the optimal strategies for each player. This minimax method can compute probably optimal strategies for all two-player zero-sum games.

Solving 

The Nash equilibrium for a two-player, zero-sum game can be found by solving a linear programming problem. Suppose a zero-sum game has a payoff matrix  where element  is the payoff obtained when the minimizing player chooses pure strategy  and the maximizing player chooses pure strategy  (i.e. the player trying to minimize the payoff chooses the row and the player trying to maximize the payoff chooses the column). The game will have at least one Nash equilibrium. The Nash equilibrium can be found (Raghavan 1994, p. 740) by solving the following linear program to find a vector :

The first constraint says each element of the  vector must be nonnegative, and the second constraint says each element of the  vector must be at least 1.  For the resulting  vector, the inverse of the sum of its elements is the value of the game.  Multiplying  by that value gives a probability vector, giving the probability that the maximizing player will choose each possible pure strategy.

If the game matrix does not have all positive elements, add a constant to every element that is large enough to make them all positive.  That will increase the value of the game by that constant, and will not affect the equilibrium mixed strategies for the equilibrium.

The equilibrium mixed strategy for the minimizing player can be found by solving the dual of the given linear program.

If all the solutions to the linear program are found, they will constitute all the Nash equilibria for the game.  Conversely, any linear program can be converted into a two-player, zero-sum game by using a change of variables that puts it in the form of the above equations and thus such games are equivalent to linear programs, in general.

Universal solution 

If avoiding a zero-sum game is an action choice with some probability for players, avoiding is always an equilibrium strategy for at least one player at a zero-sum game. For any two players zero-sum game where a zero-zero draw is impossible or non-credible after the play is started, such as poker, there is no Nash equilibrium strategy other than avoiding the play. Even if there is a credible zero-zero draw after a zero-sum game is started, it is not better than the avoiding strategy. In this sense, it's interesting to find reward-as-you-go in optimal choice computation shall prevail over all two players zero-sum games concerning starting the game or not.

The most common or simple example from the subfield of social psychology is the concept of "social traps". In some cases pursuing individual personal interest can enhance the collective well-being of the group, but in other situations, all parties pursuing personal interest results in mutually destructive behaviour.

Copeland's review notes that an n-player non-zero-sum game can be converted into an (n+1)-player zero-sum game, where the n+1st player, denoted the fictitious player, receives the negative of the sum of the gains of the other n-players (the global gain / loss).

Zero-sum three-person games 

It is clear that there are manifold relationships between players in a zero-sum three-person game, in a zero-sum two-person game, anything one player wins is necessarily lost by the other and vice versa; therefore, there is always an absolute antagonism of interests, and that is similar in the three-person game. A particular move of a player in a zero-sum three-person game would be assumed to be clearly beneficial to him and may disbenefits to both other players, or benefits to one and disbenefits to the other opponent. Particularly, parallelism of interests between two players makes a cooperation desirable; it may happen that a player has a choice among various policies: Get into a parallelism interest with another player by adjusting his conduct, or the opposite; that he can choose with which of other two players he prefers to build such parallelism, and to what extent. The picture on the left shows that a typical example of a zero-sum three-person game. If Player 1 chooses to defence, but Player 2 & 3 chooses to offence, both of them will gain one point. At the same time, Player 2 will lose two-point because points are taken away by other players, and it is evident that Player 2 & 3 has parallelism of interests.

Real life example 

Economic benefits of low-cost airlines in saturated markets - net benefits or a zero-sum game 

Studies show that the entry of low-cost airlines into the Hong Kong market brought in $671 million in revenue and resulted in an outflow of $294 million.

Therefore, the replacement effect should be considered when introducing a new model, which will lead to economic leakage and injection. Thus introducing new models requires caution. For example, if the number of new airlines departing from and arriving at the airport is the same, the economic contribution to the host city may be a zero-sum game. Because for Hong Kong, the consumption of overseas tourists in Hong Kong is income, while the consumption of Hong Kong residents in opposite cities is outflow. In addition, the introduction of new airlines can also have a negative impact on existing airlines.

Consequently, when a new aviation model is introduced, feasibility tests need to be carried out in all aspects, taking into account the economic inflow and outflow and displacement effects caused by the model.

Complexity 

It has been theorized by Robert Wright in his book Nonzero: The Logic of Human Destiny, that society becomes increasingly non-zero-sum as it becomes more complex, specialized, and interdependent.

Extensions 

In 1944, John von Neumann and Oskar Morgenstern proved that any non-zero-sum game for n players is equivalent to a zero-sum game with n + 1 players; the (n + 1)th player representing the global profit or loss.

Misunderstandings 

Zero-sum games and particularly their solutions are commonly misunderstood by critics of game theory, usually with respect to the independence and rationality of the players, as well as to the interpretation of utility functions. Furthermore, the word "game" does not imply the model is valid only for recreational games.

Politics is sometimes called zero sum because in common usage the idea of a stalemate is perceived to be "zero sum"; politics and macroeconomics are not zero sum games, however, because they do not constitute conserved systems.

Zero-sum thinking 

In psychology, zero-sum thinking refers to the perception that a given situation is like a zero-sum game, where one person's gain is equal to another person's loss.

See also 

 Bimatrix game
 Comparative advantage
 Dutch disease
 Gains from trade
 Lump of labour fallacy
 Positive-sum game
 No-win situation

References

Further reading 
 Misstating the Concept of Zero-Sum Games within the Context of Professional Sports Trading Strategies, series Pardon the Interruption (2010-09-23) ESPN, created by Tony Kornheiser and Michael Wilbon, performance by Bill Simmons
  Handbook of Game Theory – volume 2, chapter Zero-sum two-person games, (1994) Elsevier Amsterdam, by Raghavan, T. E. S., Edited by Aumann and Hart, pp. 735–759,  
 Power: Its Forms, Bases and Uses (1997) Transaction Publishers, by Dennis Wrong

External links 
 Play zero-sum games online by Elmer G. Wiens.
 Game Theory & its Applications – comprehensive text on psychology and game theory. (Contents and Preface to Second Edition.)
 A playable zero-sum game and its mixed strategy Nash equilibrium.

Non-cooperative games
International relations theory
Game theory game classes